Calotrophon velero is a species of sea snail, a marine gastropod mollusk in the family Muricidae, the murex snails or rock snails.

Description
The size of an adult shell varies between 13 mm and 25 mm.

Distribution
This species occurs in the Caribbean Sea off Colombia, Venezuela, French Guiana and the Netherlands Antilles.

References

 Merle D., Garrigues B. & Pointier J.-P. (2011) Fossil and Recent Muricidae of the world. Part Muricinae. Hackenheim: Conchbooks. 648 pp. page(s): 196
Muricidae récoltés en Guyane au cours de l’expédition La Planète Revisitée. Xenophora Taxonomy 15: 29-38

External links
 

Muricidae
Gastropods described in 1970